Got the Noise is a 2004 album by the German punk rock band Donots. It features guest appearances from members of UK punk rockers 3 Colours Red and A. The song "We Got the Noise" is featured in the video games MVP Baseball 2005 and Need for Speed: Underground Rivals.

All songs composed by the Donots. All lyrics by Ingo Donot.

Track listing
"We Got the Noise" - 3:46
"Knowledge" - 2:57
"Wretched Boy" - 3:39
"It's Over" - 3:36
"Disappear" - 2:53
"Life Ain't Gonna Wait" 3:52
"Alright Now" - 3:20
"Good-Bye Routine" - 2:51
"Your Way Home" - 3:04
"The Jerk Parade" - 2:58
"Cough It Up" - 2:58
"Better Days (Not Included)" - 2:28
"Punchline" - 2:50

References

2004 albums
Donots albums
GUN Records albums